Capitalization is writing a word with its first letter in upper case and the remaining letters in lower case. 

Capitalization may also refer to:

Economics and finance
 Market capitalization, the market value of a publicly traded company's outstanding shares
 Capital (economics), durable produced goods that are in turn used as productive inputs for further production
 Capital expenditure, the money spent to buy, maintain, or improve fixed assets
 Financial capital, any economic resource measured in terms of money

Other uses
 Capitalization in caring in intimate relationships

See also
 Capital (disambiguation)
 Capital requirement, the amount of capital a bank is required to have by its financial regulator
 Capital adequacy ratio
 Capitalization table
 Capitalism
 Letter case#Capitalisation
 Rights issue
 Undercapitalization